Nirmatrelvir/ritonavir, sold under the brand name Paxlovid, is a co-packaged oral medication, developed by Pfizer and used as a treatment for COVID-19. It contains the antiviral medications nirmatrelvir and ritonavir.

Side effects of nirmatrelvir/ritonavir include changes in sense of taste, diarrhea, high blood pressure, and muscle pain. Nirmatrelvir/ritonavir has a high potential for potentially serious drug interactions due to strong CYP3A inhibition by ritonavir. Nirmatrelvir is a SARS-CoV-2 main protease inhibitor while ritonavir is a HIV-1 protease inhibitor and strong CYP3A inhibitor. Nirmatrelvir is responsible for the antiviral activity of the medication against SARS-CoV-2 while ritonavir works by inhibiting the metabolism of nirmatrelvir and thereby strengthening its activity.

In December 2021, nirmatrelvir/ritonavir was granted emergency use authorization by the United States Food and Drug Administration (FDA) for the treatment of COVID-19. It is not authorized for the pre-exposure or post-exposure prevention of COVID-19 or for initiation of treatment in those requiring hospitalization due to severe or critical COVID-19. It was approved in the United Kingdom later that month, and in the European Union and Canada in January 2022.

Medical uses

High-risk COVID-19
The co-packaged medication is indicated in the United States for the treatment of mild to moderate COVID-19 in people aged twelve years of age and older weighing at least  with positive results of direct SARS-CoV-2 testing, and who are at high risk for progression to severe COVID-19, including hospitalization or death. In the European Union, the co-packaged medication is indicated for the treatment of COVID-19 in adults who do not require supplemental oxygen and who are at increased risk for progressing to severe COVID-19.

The primary data supporting the use of nirmatrelvir/ritonavir for high-risk COVID-19 are from EPIC-HR, a randomized, double-blind, placebo-controlled clinical trial studying nirmatrelvir/ritonavir for the treatment of non-hospitalized symptomatic adults with a laboratory confirmed diagnosis of SARS-CoV-2 infection. Participants were adults 18 years of age and older with a prespecified risk factor for progression to severe disease or were 60years and older regardless of prespecified chronic medical conditions. All participants had not received a COVID-19 vaccine and had not been previously infected with COVID-19. The main outcome measured in the trial was the proportion of people who were hospitalized due to COVID-19 or died due to any cause during 28days of follow-up. Nirmatrelvir/ritonavir significantly reduced the proportion of people with COVID-19 related hospitalization or death from any cause by 88% compared to placebo among participants treated within five days of symptom onset and who did not receive COVID-19 therapeutic monoclonal antibody treatment. In this analysis, 1,039participants had received nirmatrelvir/ritonavir, and 1,046participants had received placebo and among these participants, 0.8% who received nirmatrelvir/ritonavir were hospitalized or died during 28days of follow-up compared to 6% of the participants who received placebo.

Standard-risk COVID-19
In addition to high-risk individuals with COVID-19, nirmatrelvir/ritonavir has been evaluated in the treatment of COVID-19 in standard-risk individuals in the EPIC-SR trial. This study did not achieve its primary goal of reducing time to sustained alleviation of COVID-19 symptoms (treatment: 13days (95% CI 12–15 days); placebo: 13days (95% CI 11–14 days)). It also did not find a statistically significant reduction in the risk of hospitalization or death (treatment: 5/576 [0.9%]; placebo: 10/569 [1.8%]; p > 0.05). Likewise, findings were not statistically significant for reducing hospitalization rates in the a subgroup of vaccinated adults with at least one risk factor for severe COVID-19 (treatment: 3/361 [0.8%]; placebo: 7/360 [1.9%]; 57% reductionRR 0.43, 95% CI 0.11–1.64). However, the trial did find a statistically significant 62% decrease in COVID-19-related medical visits, similar to the 67% reduction from the EPIC-HR study of high-risk individuals. Enrollment in EPIC-SR was discontinued due to the low rate of hospitalization and death in this population.

Nirmatrelvir/ritonavir has not been approved or authorized for treatment of COVID-19 in standard-risk individuals. However, due to the partially positive results of EPIC-SR, many clinicians still prescribe nirmatrelvir/ritonavir to standard-risk individuals with COVID-19.

Other uses
, the effectiveness of nirmatrelvir/ritonavir among vaccinated people and the effectiveness against long COVID were unknown. The drug does not prevent infection in people who live with an infected person.

Available forms

Nirmatrelvir/ritonavir (Paxlovid) is provided as a combination formulation of 300 or 150mg nirmatrelvir oral tablets and 100mg ritonavir oral tablets in blister packs. The 300mg nirmatrelvir tablets are standard while the 150mg tablets are for people with moderate renal impairment. A 5-day course of nirmatrelvir/ritonavir is provided, with two nirmatrelvir tablets and one ritonavir tablet taken twice daily over this period of time.

Contraindications
The co-packaged medication is not authorized for the pre-exposure prophylaxis or post-exposure prophylaxis of COVID-19 nor for treatment in those requiring hospitalization due to severe or critical COVID-19, nor for use for longer than 5 consecutive days.
The drug is contraindicated in those with hypersensitivity to the two main components, and in those with severely reduced kidney or liver function.

Pregnancy
The co-packaged medication is not recommended during pregnancy and in women who can become pregnant and who are not using contraception. Breastfeeding should be interrupted during treatment. These recommendations are because laboratory studies in animals suggest that high doses of the co-packaged medication may affect the growth of the fetus.

There are no human data on the use of nirmatrelvir during pregnancy related to the risk of birth defects, spontaneous abortions (miscarriage), or adverse outcomes. There are also no human data on the presence of nirmatrelvir in human milk, its effects on milk production or the infant. In pregnant rabbits, a reduction in fetal body weight was observed with systemic exposure ten times higher than the authorized human dose of the co-packaged medication. A temporary reduction in body weight was observed in the offspring of nursing rats.

Side effects
Adverse events of the co-packaged medication, regardless of causality, observed in the phase II-III EPIC-HR study included: dysgeusia (6% vs. < 1% for placebo), diarrhea (3% vs. 2% for placebo), hypertension (1% vs. < 1% for placebo), and myalgia (1% vs. < 1% for placebo). In clinical trials, 2% of people discontinued treatment due to side effects with nirmatrelvir/ritonavir while 4% in the placebo group did so. Nirmatrelvir/ritonavir is still under investigation, so its side effects have yet to be fully evaluated and may not be completely known.

Other side effects of nirmatrelvir/ritonavir may include hypersensitivity reactions, liver toxicity, and development of HIV drug resistance in people with uncontrolled or undiagnosed HIV infection. Hypersensitivity reactions (allergic reactions) may manifest as skin rash, hives, difficulty swallowing, difficulty breathing, angioedema, and/or anaphylaxis. Liver toxicity may manifest as elevated transaminases and clinical hepatitis, including symptoms like appetite loss, jaundice (yellowing of the skin and whites of eyes), dark-colored urine, pale-colored stools, itchy skin, and abdominal pain.

Overdose
There is no specific antidote for overdose with the co-packaged medication. Treatment consists of supportive measures such as monitoring of vital signs and observation of clinical status.

Interactions 

Co-administration with certain drugs may have serious effects and may sometimes be fatal. The drug is contraindicated when co-administered with certain drugs, such as drugs dependent on CYP3A for removal, for which a raised concentration results in serious reactions, or those with potent CYP3A inducers, for which reduced blood concentration of the two main components may result in loss of effect against the virus and possible resistance, among others. Co-administration also affects the concentration of several drugs, sometimes requiring changing the dose or careful monitoring. Many of these drugs are widely prescribed to people at high risk from COVID-19. With the extension of the emergency authorization in August 2022, the FDA updated a checklist to help evaluate potential drug interactions and other patient factors before prescribing Paxlovid, including more than 120 drugs which are either contraindicated, should be avoided or held from use, or require dose adjustments or special monitoring.

Nirmatrelvir/ritonavir is said to be safe in combination with over-the-counter pain- and fever-reducing medications like acetaminophen (paracetamol; Tylenol) and ibuprofen (Motrin).

Pharmacology

Pharmacodynamics
Nirmatrelvir is a SARS-CoV-2 main protease (Mpro, 3CLpro, nsp5 protease) inhibitor while ritonavir is an HIV-1 protease inhibitor and strong CYP3A inhibitor. Nirmatrelvir is the main active agent in the formulation, while ritonavir inhibits the metabolism of nirmatrelvir and thereby strengthens its activity. Ritonavir is not active against or thought to directly contribute to the antiviral activity of the medication against SARS-CoV-2. Nirmatrelvir/ritonavir works against COVID-19 by preventing the replication of SARS-CoV-2, which the SARS-CoV-2 main protease is essential for.

Pharmacokinetics

Absorption
The time to peak concentrations of nirmatrelvir combined with ritonavir is 3.00hours (range 1.02–6.00hours) while that of ritonavir is 3.98hours. Peak concentrations of nirmatrelvir combined with ritonavir following a single dose (300mg nirmatrelvir and 100mg ritonavir) in healthy individuals are 2.21μg/mL while total exposure is 23.01μg•h/mL. Taking nirmatrelvir/ritonavir with a high-fat meal modestly increases exposure to nirmatrelvir (peak concentrations increased by 15% and total exposure increased by 1.6%) relative to taking them under fasting conditions.

Distribution
The volume of distribution (Vz/F) of nirmatrelvir combined with ritonavir is 104.7L while that of ritonavir is 112.4L. The blood-to-plasma ratio of nirmatrelvir combined with ritonavir is 0.60 while the red-blood-cell-to-plasma ratio of ritonavir is 0.14. The plasma protein binding of nirmatrelvir combined with ritonavir is 69% while that of ritonavir is 98 to 99%.

Metabolism
Nirmatrelvir is mainly a substrate of CYP3A in terms of its metabolism. When combined with ritonavir however, which is a strong CYP3A4 inhibitor, the metabolism of nirmatrelvir is minimal and its elimination instead is mainly via renal excretion. Ritonavir is eliminated mainly by hepatic metabolism, with major and minor enzymes involved being CYP3A4 and CYP2D6, respectively.

Elimination
Nirmatrelvir combined with ritonavir is excreted 35.3% in feces and 49.6% in urine, while ritonavir is excreted 86.4% in feces and 11.3% in urine.

The oral clearance (CL/F) of nirmatrelvir combined with ritonavir is 8.99 while that of ritonavir is 13.92. The elimination half-life of nirmatrelvir combined with ritonavir is (mean ± SD) 6.05 ± 1.79hours while that of ritonavir is 6.15hours. The half-life of nirmatrelvir combined with ritonavir makes the formulation suitable for twice-daily administration once every 12hours.

Specific populations
The pharmacokinetics of nirmatrelvir/ritonavir based on age or gender have not been assessed. Exposure to nirmatrelvir/ritonavir was numerically lower in Japanese people than in Western individuals but not to a clinically meaningful extent. Peak concentrations, total exposure, time to peak concentrations, and elimination half-life of nirmatrelvir combined with ritonavir are severity-dependently increased in people with renal impairment. Conversely, they are not increased in people with moderate hepatic impairment. The combination has not been studied in people with severe hepatic impairment.

History
The primary data supporting the US Food and Drug Administration (FDA) emergency use authorization for nirmatrelvir/ritonavir were from the EPIC-HR trial, a large randomized controlled trial which studied nirmatrelvir/ritonavir for the treatment of adults with COVID-19 at high-risk for developing severe COVID-19. EPIC-HR was started in July 2021 and was completed in December 2021. Nirmatrelvir/ritonavir was found to be significantly effective in reducing the proportion of people with COVID-19-related hospitalization or death in this trial. On 14 December 2021, Pfizer also announced that a Phase II/III study of nirmatrelvir/ritonavir showed a reduced risk of hospitalization or death.

In December 2021, nirmatrelvir/ritonavir was granted emergency use authorization by the United States Food and Drug Administration (FDA) for the treatment of COVID-19. On 31 December, the United Kingdom's Medicines and Healthcare products Regulatory Agency (MHRA) approved the use of nirmatrelvir combined with ritonavir for adults with mild to moderate infection and at high risk of their illness worsening.

In August 2021, Pfizer began a phase II/III trial of nirmatrelvir/ritonavir for COVID-19 in standard-risk individuals with COVID-19 known as EPIC-SR. Interim results of this trial were announced in December 2021, and final results were released in June 2022. The study did not find a statistically significant reduction in the risk of hospitalization, death, or sustained alleviation of symptoms, although there was a significant decrease in COVID-19-related medical visits. Pfizer discontinued enrollment in the study with the reason given being the very low rate of hospitalization and death in this population.

In April 2022, it was announced that the PANORAMIC trial would start testing the effectiveness of nirmatrelvir/ritonavir for treating COVID-19 infections.

Society and culture

Legal status
On 16 November 2021, Pfizer submitted an application to the US Food and Drug Administration (FDA) for emergency use authorization for the co-packaged medication. The authorization was granted on 22 December 2021, for adults and children ages 12 and older who are infected with Covid and at risk. The European Medicines Agency (EMA) issued guidance about the use of the co-packaged medication for the treatment of COVID-19 in the EU on 16 December 2021. The Israeli Ministry of Health approved the use of the co-packaged medication on 26 December 2021. South Korea approved the use of the co-packaged medication on 27 December 2021.

The UK Medicines and Healthcare products Regulatory Agency (MHRA) granted conditional approval of the co-packaged medication in December 2021. Health Canada approved the use of the co-packaged medication in January 2022. The Singapore Health Sciences Authority approved the use of the co-packaged medication for treating adults in February 2022. In February 2022, China approved the medication for the treatment of adults who have mild to moderate COVID-19 and are at a high risk of progressing to a severe condition.

Primovir, produced by Astrica and Paxista which is produced by Azista are both generic versions that are manufactured and distributed in India.

Manufacturing
Pfizer selected its largest oral tablet factory in Freiburg as the launch facility for the manufacturing of the co-packaged medication. Nirmatrelvir, the novel portion of the co-packaged medication, was first developed in the United States and was initially manufactured in small amounts in Groton, Connecticut, to support clinical trials, but the Freiburg facility in Germany was responsible for figuring out how to mass-produce the co-packaged medication on an industrial scale. Pfizer selected another factory in Ascoli Piceno, Italy, to assist the Freiburg factory with packaging tablets into blister packs.

Economics
In December 2021, the German government ordered 1 million doses of, but by August 2022, only around 43,000 had been delivered by wholesalers to pharmacies. In Germany, Paxlovid is by prescription through physicians only and German physicians have been reluctant to prescribe it. Hence, health minister Karl Lauterbach decided that general practitioners can stock 5 Paxlovid courses in their practice and dispense it directly to patients, that a prescription would be remunerated with 15 Euros and that every nursing home should appoint a vaccination officer as well as a Paxlovid officer. As of August 2022 the treatment guidelines, which German family doctors follow, have not been updated since February 2022 and recommend Paxlovid only in unvaccinated risk patients, i.e. in only a few people.

As of April 2022, the United States ordered a total of 20 million Paxlovid courses. As of July 2022, the United States Department of Health and Human Services set up at least 2,200 sites where people could receive Paxlovid as soon as they test positive for the virus, including pharmacies, community health centers and long-term care facilities. In July 2022, the US FDA allowed state-licensed pharmacists to prescribe it to people with COVID-19 at high risk of progressing to severe disease.

In December 2022, after China abandoned its Zero Covid policy and Paxlovid was in short supply, the powerful and elite in China scrambled to purchase Paxlovid and give it as a valuable gift.

Comparison to ivermectin

The co-packaged medication is sometimes falsely claimed to be a repackaged version of the antiparasitic drug ivermectin, which has been falsely promoted as a COVID-19 therapeutic. Such claims, sometimes using the nickname "Pfizermectin", rely on superficial similarities between the mechanism of action of the drugs and the claim that Pfizer is suppressing the benefits of ivermectin.

Research

Rebound
An additional analysis of the original EPIC-HR clinical trial data (Delta variant) showed that about 2% of both the treatment and placebo groups experienced a symptomatic rebound after the 5 day treatment, meaning they felt ill again and tested positive again (antigen test and PCR test) after testing negative. This is important, because people with rebound cannot go back to work or school. The exact cause is unknown, but there is speculation that it is due to reservoirs in tissues that are not reached by the medication, or reinfection. In May 2022, Pfizer suggested repeating the treatment, but the FDA said there has been no evidence of benefit.

In a 2022 US case report of ten people with rebound COVID-19 found viral load during relapse was comparable to levels during an initial infection and high enough to cause secondary transmission. President Joe Biden, First Lady Jill Biden, Anthony Fauci, Peter Hotez and Rochelle Walensky are known to have experienced rebound. As of June 2022, Pfizer is studying the phenomenon in a new trial it calls EPIC-SR (standard risk) while the omicron variant is circulating.

As of July 2022, no Paxlovid drug resistant SARS-CoV-2 has been observed in clinical context. The engineering of a nirmatrelvir-resistant chimera of Vesicular Stomatitis Virus (VSV) under laboratory conditions was published without formal peer review in July 2022. As of November 2022, multiple pathways that could lead to Paxlovid resistance have been demonstrated in vitro.

References

External links 
 
 
 

Combination antiviral drugs
COVID-19 drug development
CYP3A4 inhibitors
Pfizer brands
SARS-CoV-2 main protease inhibitors